Zubtsovsky Uyezd (Зубцовский уезд) was one of the subdivisions of the Tver Governorate of the Russian Empire. It was situated in the southern part of the governorate. Its administrative centre was Zubtsov.

Demographics
At the time of the Russian Empire Census of 1897, Zubtsovsky Uyezd had a population of 103,109. Of these, 98.7% spoke Russian and 1.2% Karelian as their native language.

References

 
Uezds of Tver Governorate
Tver Governorate